Theo Brandmüller (* 2 February 1948 in Mainz; † 26 November 2012 in Saarbrücken) was a German composer of Contemporary Music, organist and university teacher.

Life 
Brandmüller studied school and church music as well as composition with Giselher Klebe, Olivier Messiaen and Cristóbal Halffter and instrumental theatre with Mauricio Kagel; he was accepted as a scholarship holder of the Studienstiftung des deutschen Volkes.

After working as organist at St. George's in Mainz-Bretzenheim, he received a call to the Hochschule für Musik Saar in 1979. There he first worked as professor for music theory, then for composition, analysis and organ improvisation. Later he was also director of the Institute for Contemporary Music. Since 1982 he has also been titular organist at the Ludwigskirche in Saarbrücken and since 1986 consiliarius of the Consociatio Internationalis Musicae Sacrae in Rome.

He achieved his international breakthrough as a composer in 1977 at the World Music Days in Athens with the work Ach, trauriger Mond, a commissioned work for Südwestfunk.

His compositional output, consisting of some 130 works, includes secular music and church music, chamber and vocal music as well as music for stage works and symphonic compositions. An opera commissioned by the Saarland State Theatre remained unfinished. He found inspiration for his compositions in the poetry of Christian Morgenstern and Federico García Lorca, among others, as well as in the fine arts (such as Paul Klee).

In addition to his work as a university lecturer, he was also active as a lecturer in various composition courses: he supervised the youth composition courses of the Jeunesses Musicales and taught at the "Forum junger Komponisten". He was also active internationally as a lecturer in organ composition and improvisation.

In his worldwide organ concerts, Brandmüller preferred contemporary works and improvisations. He has worked with internationally renowned conductors such as Marcello Viotti, Max Pommer, Gabriel Chmura, Leif Segerstam, Cristóbal Halffter and Peter Ruzicka.

Awards 
 1972: Prize for Composers of the State of Rhineland-Palatinate
 1977: Composition Prize of the City of Stuttgart
 1979: Rome Prize of the Villa Massimo
 1986: Art Prize of the Saarland
 1986: Prix Marzena, Seattle
 1998: Art Prize of Rhineland-Palatinate
 2005: Honorary Diploma of the Observatoire des Relations Franco-Allemandes pour la Construction Européenne
 2007: Guest of Honour of the Villa Massimo (Rome)

Works (selection)

Chamber music 

 Musik der Stille und Obertöne (1972, rev. 1978) für for piano trio and percussion
 Cis-Cantus II (1986) for viola, violoncello and double bass
 Still und heiter (1991) for recorder (Sino.A.T.B) and percussion
 Konzert auf dem E-Zweig (1991) (after a picture by Paul Klee) for viola solo (dedicated to Eckart Schloifer)
 Imaginations (1991) for viola and chamber ensemble
 Nirwana-Fax I – in memoriam John Cage (1996) for chamber ensemble
 Nirwana-Fax II – in memoriam Olivier Messiaen (1996/97) for chamber ensemble
 Nachtflug mit Messiaenfenster (2008) for piano quartet
 Geheime Botschaften (2012) for clarinet quintet

Concert works 

 Sonata a tre (1973) for flute, mezzo-soprano and violoncello
 Apokalyptische Vision (1975) for bass voice and organ after words from the Holy Scriptures
 Reminiszenzen (1975, rev. 1976) for orchestra
 Ach, trauriger Mond (1977).. Lament for Federico García Lorca for percussion solo and strings
 Morgenstern – Abendstern (1977). "Settings" of some evening poems by Christian Morgenstern for baritone, two pianos, tuba, double bass and percussion.
 Wie Du unseren Vätern geschworen hast (1978). Cantata for alto voice, two trumpets, two trombones, organ after texts of the Holy Scripture
 Dramma per Musica (1979/80) for large orchestra
 Venezianische Schatten (1981). Epitaph to Igor Stravinsky for small orchestra
 Konzert für Orgel und Orchester (1981) - Concerto for organ and orchestra
 U(h)rtöne (1985) for large orchestra
 Cis-Cantus III „Lorca-Kathedralen" (1987) for large orchestra
 OrganuM–zart (1991). Orchestral fantasy on a Mozartian minor triad for clarinet, strings, percussion and organ
 Und der Mond heftet ins Meer ein langes Horn aus Licht und Tanz (1992/93). 5 cosmic episodes for viola, violoncello, double bass and large orchestra (with tape) after text ideas by Federico García Lorca
 Chimères (1996) for saxophone quartet and orchestra (with tape)
 Antigone (1999) 3rd sound song for choir with soli, 2 pianos and percussion
 Lass den Balkon geöffnet (2004/05). 5 Night Calls for orchestra

Stage music 

 for Zwei zu Ross und einer auf dem Esel by Oldřich Daněk
 for Die Bluthochzeit by Federico García Lorca
 for Hamlet by William Shakespeare
 for Sir John und Goldjunge Heinz (freely based on The Merry Wives of Windsor)
 for Katharina Knie by Carl Zuckmayer
 Löwe, leih mir deine Stimme. Luzifer-Monodram (1999–2000) after a poem by Johannes Kühn

Organ works 

 Hommage à Pérotin (1978) for organ
 La nuit de Pâques (1980). A Litany for Organ and Live Electronics
 Innenlicht (1982) for organ
 Sieben Stücke zur Passionszeit (1983) for organ
 Enigma I (1989) for violin and organ
 Monodie für I. in memoriam Isang Yun (1995) for organ
 Drei Engel für Scelsi (2001) for three clarinets and organ
 Norge (2007). Mountain resonances with shepherd calls for Organ

Pupils 
His students include, among others: Manuel Gera (* 1963), Zeynep Gedizlioğlu (* 1977), Wolfram Graf (* 1965), Han Aseon (* 1963), Christian Klein (* 1967), Stefan Lindemann (* 1969), Karola Obermüller (* 1977), Javier Party (* 1980), Marc Schubring (* 1968), Wang Lin (王琳) (* 1976), Anton Steinecker (* 1971) and the organist Dan Zerfaß (* 1968).

Literature 

 Theo Brandmüller: Arrièregarde – Avantgarde. Texte zur Musik 1980–1998. (= Quellentexte zur Musik des 20. Jahrhunderts. Bd. 6.1.) Edited by Stefan Fricke, Wolfgang Frobenius, Sigrid Konrad and Friedrich Spangemacher. Pfau-Verlag, Saarbrücken 1998, ISBN 3-89727-006-4.
 Joachim Dorfmüller: Impulse von Perotin bis Messiaen. Zum Schaffen Theo Brandmüllers für und mit Orgel. In: Musica Sacra. Regensburg 1980. Pages 316–318.
 Jörg Abbing, Sigrid Konrad: Vingt Regards sur Theo. Komponist, Konzertorganist, Hochschullehrer. Pfau-Verlag, Saarbrücken 2013, ISBN 978-3-89727-496-9.
 Friedrich Spangemacher: Creator, Spiritus, Musicus: Theo Brandmüller – eine Biographie. Pfau-Verlag, Saarbrücken 2013, ISBN 978-3-89727-497-6.

Discography 

 Canzona lirica e danza di morte. Reinbert Evers (guitar). CD Darbinghaus and Grimm 3292
 Cis-Cantus II. trio basso. CD Koch-Schwann 310 041
 Enigma I. Christiane Edinger (violin), Theo Brandmüller (organ). CD MDG 625 0551-2
 Enigma III „Ex oriente lux". Albert Schönberger (organ), Benedikt Sturm and Christopher Ludwig (boy sopranos of the Mainz Cathedral Choir), Mainzer Dombläser, Direction: Mathias Breitschaft. CD "Komponisten aus Rheinland-Pfalz", Studio Tonmeister 10778-01
 "Und der Mond heftet ins Meer ein langes Horn aus Licht und Tanz ...". Contra-Trio, Radio-Sinfonieorchester Saarbrücken, direction: Marcello Viotti. CD MDG 625 0551-2

References

External links 

 Biografie und Werkliste (biography and list of works) on breitkopf.com
 Kurzbiografie und Werkliste (short biography and list of works) on boosey.com

German composers
1948 births
2012 deaths
Academic staff of the Hochschule für Musik Saar
20th-century German musicians